Dialloubé is a small town and rural commune in the Cercle of Mopti in the Mopti Region of Mali. The commune covers an area of approximately 1,425 square kilometers and includes the town and 8 villages. In the 2009 census the commune had a population of 13,727.

References

External links
.

Communes of Mopti Region